Roger Moulding (born 3 January 1958) is an English former first-class cricketer active 1977–83 who played for Middlesex and Oxford University. He was born in Enfield, Middlesex.

He was educated at Haberdashers' Aske's School for Boys, Elstree.

References

1958 births
Living people
English cricketers
Middlesex cricketers
Oxford University cricketers
Alumni of Christ Church, Oxford
People educated at Haberdashers' Boys' School